Edward Rogers (May 30, 1787 – May 29, 1857) was an American lawyer and politician who served one term as a U.S. Representative from New York from 1839 to 1841.

Biography 
Born in Cornwall, Connecticut, Rogers completed preparatory studies and was graduated from Williams College, Williamstown, Massachusetts, in 1809.
He moved to New York State about the close of the War of 1812.
He was graduated from Yale College.
He studied law.
He was admitted to the bar and commenced practice in Madison, New York.

Political career 
He served as delegate to the State convention to revise the constitution in 1822.
He served as judge of the court of common pleas for Madison County.

Congress 
Rogers was elected as a Democrat to the Twenty-sixth Congress (March 4, 1839 – March 3, 1841).

Later career and death 
He resumed the practice of law.
He also engaged in literary pursuits.

He died in Galway, New York on May 29, 1857, and was interred in Madison Cemetery.

Family 
He was the father of Hezekiah Gold Rogers, the United States charge d'affaires in Sardinia from 1840-41.

Sources

External links

 

1787 births
1857 deaths
Williams College alumni
Yale College alumni
People from Cornwall, Connecticut
Democratic Party members of the United States House of Representatives from New York (state)
New York (state) state court judges
19th-century American politicians
19th-century American judges